Joanne Whalley (born 25 August 1961) is an English actress who began her career in 1974. She has appeared primarily on television, but also in nearly 30 feature films, including Dance with a Stranger (1985), Willow (1988), Scandal (1989), Storyville (1992)  The Secret Rapture (1993)  Scarlett (1994) and Mother's Boys (1994). Following her marriage to Val Kilmer in 1988, she was credited as Joanne Whalley-Kilmer until their divorce in 1996.

Whalley was nominated for the BAFTA TV Award for Best Actress for the 1985 BBC serial Edge of Darkness, and was nominated for a Best Actress Golden Nymph Award at the Monte-Carlo Television Festival for the 2011 series The Borgias. Her other television roles include the 1986 BBC serial The Singing Detective; playing Jackie Bouvier Kennedy Onassis in the eponymous 2000 CBS TV film, Claudia, wife of Pontius Pilate in the 2015 NBC series A.D. The Bible Continues, and Sister Maggie in Daredevil.

Early life
Whalley was born in Salford, Lancashire, and later moved to Levenshulme and then to Stockport, Greater Manchester. There, she attended Bredbury Comprehensive School, before leaving to study at Harrytown Convent Girls' School in Romiley and the Braeside School of Speech and Drama in Marple.

Whalley first appeared as a child in How We Used to Live and Juliet Bravo, and also had bit parts in soap operas, especially Coronation Street and Emmerdale. Her early film roles include a non-speaking part as a groupie in Pink Floyd's The Wall, and a young Beatles fan in Birth of the Beatles.

Musical career
In the post-punk era, she flirted with the fringes of the Manchester New Wave scene and was briefly a member of a Stockport-based band called the Slowguns, but left before the release of their two singles. Later, she was the lead singer of the pop group Cindy & The Saffrons; they recorded the Shangri-Las' song "Past, Present and Future" in 1982 at Abbey Road Studios, and the track made the UK singles charts, peaking at #56.  The next year they recorded "Terry", written and originally recorded by Twinkle, but this single failed to chart. The group split up soon afterward.

Acting career
In 1982, she played Ingrid Rothwell in A Kind of Loving, a well-received Granada TV adaptation of Stan Barstow's three Vic Brown novels.

Whalley came to prominence on British television as Emma Craven in Troy Kennedy Martin's Edge of Darkness (1985), then as Nurse Mills in the Dennis Potter-written serial The Singing Detective (1986)both for BBC Television. In 1987, she played Jackie in the TV film Will You Love Me Tomorrow; she also played a role in The Good Father (1985), another Channel 4-backed film.

Whalley met the American actor Val Kilmer in 1987 while filming the fantasy adventure Willow. After their wedding in 1988, she moved to Los Angeles and began using 'Joanne Whalley-Kilmer' as her professional SAG-AFTRA name. She continued  making more films in Hollywood than in the UK. In 1989, Whalley-Kilmer played the role of Christine Keeler in Scandal alongside stars John Hurt and Sir Ian McKellen. In 1991, she starred in the mystery noir Shattered.

In 1994, she was the lead actress in Trial By Jury, with co-stars Armand Assante and William Hurt, among others. Also in 1994, she became the second actress to play Gone with the Wind heroine Scarlett O'Hara when she appeared in a made-for-TV adaptation of the sequel novel, Scarlett. She later starred in the 1997 film The Man Who Knew Too Little.

After her divorce from Kilmer in 1996, for personal and professional reasons, she changed her surname back to Whalley. Whalley played the title character in the 2000 television film Jackie Bouvier Kennedy Onassis.  She later collaborated with the pop-punk band Blink-182, reading a letter at the beginning of the song "Stockholm Syndrome". In 2005, she appeared as Queen Mary I in The Virgin Queen, a BBC serial about the life of Queen Elizabeth I which also starred Anne-Marie Duff and Tara FitzGerald. That same year she filmed Played which also starred her ex-husband Val Kilmer. However, the two did not share any scenes together. In 2006, she appeared in Life Line, a two-part drama on BBC1, starring opposite Ray Stevenson.

In February 2008, she appeared on stage in Billy Roche's Poor Beast in the Rain presented by the Salem K. Theatre Company at the Matrix Theatre in Los Angeles.  In that same year, Whalley was also a regular in the ITV mini series Flood with Robert Carlyle amongst others.

In 2011, Whalley played one of the female leads, Vannozza dei Cattanei, mistress of Cardinal Rodrigo Borgia, future Pope Alexander VI, in the Showtime historical drama The Borgias. She guest-starred as Princess Sophie in season 4 of Gossip Girl. With the cast of 44 Inch Chest, she shared the Best Ensemble Award at the San Diego Film Critics Society Awards 2010. The film reunited her with John Hurt, with whom she had done two previous films. In 2014 she played Aunt Patience in Jamaica Inn for BBC One. In 2015, she played Claudia, the wife of Pontius Pilate, in A.D. The Bible Continues, and Catherine of Aragon in the BBC miniseries Wolf Hall.

In 2018, she appeared in the third season of Daredevil as Sister Maggie.

In 2020, Whalley starred in Eleanor Coppola's anthology film Love Is Love Is Love. It was scheduled to have its world premiere at the Tribeca Film Festival in April 2020, but the festival was postponed due to the COVID-19 pandemic. The film subsequently premiered at the Deauville American Film Festival in France in September of that year.

In November 2022, she reprised her role as Sorsha in the Disney+ Willow sequel series.

In 2023, she appears in the Amazon Prime Video series Carnival Row in the 2nd episode of season 2 in the role of Leonora.

Personal life
Whalley met American actor Val Kilmer while filming the movie Willow. The couple married in 1988. Whalley took a break from acting to bring up two children with Kilmer: a daughter, Mercedes, born on 29 October 1991 in Santa Fe, New Mexico, and a son, Jack, born on 6 June 1995. Shortly after that, the pair separated. Whalley filed for divorce on 21 July 1995, citing irreconcilable differences.

Filmography

Film

Television

References

External links

1961 births
English child actresses
English expatriates in the United States
English film actresses
English pop singers
English television actresses
Living people
Actresses from Salford
Actors from Stockport
20th-century English actresses
21st-century English actresses